Tomáš Jirsák (born 29 June 1984 in Vysoké Mýto) is a retired Czech footballer who played as a midfielder.

Club career
Jirsák played his first professional years with FC Hradec Králové, before moving to FK Teplice. In July 2007 he joined Polish Ekstraklasa side Wisła Kraków on a five-year contract for an undisclosed fee. In 2007–08 season he won the Ekstraklasa championship with Wisła contributing with 2 goals and 3 assists in 20 matches. In the following 2008–09 season, he won the Ekstraklasa title for the second time in a row.

Botev Plovdiv

2012–13 season
On 3 July 2012 Jirsák joined Botev Plovdiv. He made a debut in A Grupa on 11 August 2013 when Botev Plovdiv achieved a 3-0 win against Slavia Sofia. In his first season with the yellow-black kit he was a regular first team player. Jirsák took part in 25 games in A Grupa and one for the Bulgarian Cup. Thanks to his contributions Botev Plovdiv finished on 4th place of A Grupa.

2013-14
In his second season with the yellow-black jersey Jirsák played in 47 matches (33 in A Grupa, 8 in Bulgarian Cup and 6 in UEFA Europa League. Thanks to him and his teammates Botev Plovdiv finished again on 4th place of A Grupa and reached the final of the Bulgarian Cup.

On 7 July 2013 Jirsak scored his first goal for the club from about 25 metres against Astana in Europa League tournament. Botev Plovdiv achieved an away win with 0:1. On 25 August he gave the win with close range goal against Slavia Sofia with 3:2.

2014-15
Velislav Vutsov, the new manager of Botev Plovdiv for season 2014–15, assigned a more attacking role for Jirsak. Tomáš was among the goalscorers twice in his first three games in A Grupa. He scored against Cherno More Varna and Slavia Sofia but he also received a red card at end of the dramatic 3-3 draw with Litex Lovech.

On 24 October Tomáš Jirsák scored the second goal for his team during the second half of the game against Beroe Stara Zagora. Botev Plovdiv defeated Beroe Stara Zagora with 3-1.

On 2 November Tomáš played his 90th game for Botev Plovdiv. He is the foreign player with the most games for the club.

On 8 November Jirsák scored a magnificent goal after an assist by Marian Ognyanov during the 1-2 away win against Litex Lovech.

His goal against Litex Lovech was selected for the best goal in A Grupa for 2014.

As expected Jirsák was in the starting lineup for the last three games of the regular season in A Grupa which were played in March 2015. His excellent performance was crucial for the three wins in a row for Botev Plovdiv against Marek Dupnitsa, Lokomotiv Plovdiv, and CSKA Sofia.

On 5 April 2015 Jirsák became the first foreign player with 100 games for Botev Plovdiv.

Jirsák scored the only goal for Botev Plovdiv during the 1-3 defeat from Ludogorets Razgrad on 3 May 2015. He received a yellow card during the game with Litex Lovech and was banned for the next two games with CSKA Sofia and Beroe Stara Zagora. Jirsák returned to the starting lineup for the 0-2 home defeat from Lokomotiv Sofia. After this game it was announced that the contacts of Tomáš Jirsák and his friend, the goalkeeper Adam Stachowiak, will not be renewed and both of them will leave the club.

International career
Jirsák was capped 22 times for Czech Republic national under-21 football team. He represented the country at the 2007 UEFA European Under-21 Football Championship.

Statistics 
 (correct as of 1 June 2015)

Honours

Wisła Kraków
Ekstraklasa: 2007–08, 2008–09, 2010–11

Botev Plovdiv
 Bulgarian Cup Runner-up: 2014
 Bulgarian Supercup Runner-up: 2014
BNT award for best (most beautiful) goal: 2014

References

External links
 
 
 Player profile on official site
 video compilation

1984 births
Living people
Czech footballers
Czech Republic under-21 international footballers
Czech expatriate footballers
Czech First League players
FC Hradec Králové players
FK Teplice players
Wisła Kraków players
Botev Plovdiv players
FC Irtysh Pavlodar players
Ekstraklasa players
First Professional Football League (Bulgaria) players
Kazakhstan Premier League players
Expatriate footballers in Poland
Expatriate footballers in Bulgaria
Expatriate footballers in Kazakhstan
Czech expatriate sportspeople in Bulgaria
Czech expatriate sportspeople in Poland
People from Vysoké Mýto
Association football midfielders
Sportspeople from the Pardubice Region